The L30A1, officially designated Gun 120 mm Tk L30, is a 120 mm rifled tank gun. It is the main armament of the British Challenger 2 main battle tank used by the British Army, and Royal Army of Oman (and soon to be used by the Armed Forces of Ukraine).

The L30A1 is an improved production model of the Royal Ordnance L11 series of rifled tank guns that was fitted to Challenger 1 and Cheiftain tanks.

Challenger Armament
The Challenger Armament (CHARM) project was intended to provide a new main armament for the Challenger 2 tank and to be retro-fitted to the Challenger 1. It involved three components: the gun, developed by the Royal Ordnance Factory, Nottingham, the depleted uranium (DU) APFSDS round, and a propellant charge for it.

After earlier projects were cancelled, the EXP 32M1 experimental gun was re-titled the XL30E4 and accepted for production as the L30 in 1989. The Challenger 2 tank was first produced in 1993.

Design

It is made of electro-slag refined steel. The bore and chamber are electro-plated with chromium to give a barrel life of 400 effective full charges.

The breech mechanism is a split sliding-block breech. One vertically sliding block holds a Crossley-type elastomeric obturation ring (which is necessary because the propellant charges are combustible cases or bags) and is locked for firing by a second block. When the second block falls, the first is released to open the breech.

Accident
An accident deemed to have been due largely to a design fault in the L30 gun killed two men and injured two others. On 14 June 2017, a Challenger 2 from The Royal Tank Regiment suffered an ammunition explosion during live firing exercises at the Castlemartin Range in Pembrokeshire. The tank was firing 120 mm practice shells with a standard propellant charge. The explosion critically injured the four-man crew, with two later dying of their wounds in hospital. All British Army tank firing exercises were suspended for 48 hours while the cause of the explosion was investigated. It was determined that a bolt vent axial (BVA) seal assembly had been removed during an earlier exercise and had not been replaced at the time of the incident, allowing explosive gases to enter the turret space, detonating two bag charges that had not been stowed in the internal ammunition bins as required by correct procedure. The lack of a written process for removal and replacement of the seal assembly meant that the crew  were unaware of its absence. The coroner at the inquest said that the main cause of the incident was that inadequate consideration had been given during the production of the L30 gun as to whether it could be fired without the seal assembly.

Ammunition

The ammunition types which are currently or were formerly in use include:

Projectiles
L23A1 APFSDS: The penetrator is made from a tungsten–nickel–copper alloy with a 6 bladed aluminium fin and is located in a three-segment aluminium alloy saddle-type sabot. The shot 120mm TK APFSDS, L23 is used with the L8A1 charge. The L23A1 is capable of defeating the NATO Single Heavy Target (150mm RHA at 60°) at 6350 m and the NATO Triple Heavy Target (triple array equivalent to 110mm RHA at 65°) at 6300 m. In 2010, BAE Munitions undertook a feasibility study to model the ballistic/energetic effect of the L23A1 APFSDS and the L18A1 CCC charge combination. Function and consistency tests were completed in September 2012 with armour plate firing completed in December 2012 and strength of propelling charge tests completed in February 2013 at the Lulworth ranges. The Challenger 2 live crew clearance firing tests were completed in May 2013. The Royal Army of Oman expected the L18A1 charge to be certified for operation with their Challenger 2's 120 mm L23A1 ammunition in August 2013 with deliveries taking place by mid-2014.
L23A2 APFSDS: Considered as a replacement for the L23A1 shot. British qualification had been scheduled for 2010 and production for Oman was supposed to start just after. The L23A2 is backwards-compatible with the older L11A5 gun used by the Royal Jordanian Army Al-Hussein main battle tanks (phased out in 2018).
L26A1 APFSDS: It was developed under the CHARM 1 (CHallenger ARMament 1) programme and can be fired from both the L11 gun in and the L30 gun. It  has a depleted uranium long rod penetrator surrounded by an aluminium alloy sabot. The L26A1 shot and the less-volatile L14 bag charge combination is known as the JERICHO round (Jericho 1 with the L8 charge and Jericho 2 with the L14 charge). The Jericho 1 combination was about 15% better in penetration terms than the L23A1 and closer to 25% when fired from the L30A1 gun with the L14 charge.
L27A1 APFSDS: Also known as CHARM 3 (CHallenger ARMament 3), it features a longer penetrator made of depleted uranium to defeat complex armour arrays and advanced forms of ERA. The 120 mm Tk APFSDS CHARM 3 uses the safer L16A1 CCC (Combustible Cartridge Case) charge and is designated CHARM 3A1 when using the L17 bag charge. The L27 entered in service in 1999. Muzzle velocity is 
L28A1 APFSDS: A private development initiated in the late 1990s, Royal Ordnance Defence began the development of a new tungsten alloy long-rod penetrator APFSDS-T round (the L28) to enhance the appeal of the Challenger 2 tank on the export market. By late 2001, the British Army had begun procuring the L28 round.
L28A2 APFSDS: A newer export 120 mm APFSDS projectile designated L28A2. The UK Ministry of Defence funded the L28A2 work specifically for Oman, which wanted to replace its old L23A1 APFSDS. The work on the L28A2 round also included some of the technology incorporated into the CHARM 3 (C3TR) propelling charge system already in service with the British Army. This used a British low-pressure charge system and advanced penetrator material, as used in other in-service rounds. The L28A2 contract was supposed to enable BAE Systems Land Systems to complete the de-risking of the L28A2 in early 2008. Qualification tests and mass production were scheduled for 2009.
L29A1 DS-T: also known as CHARM 3 Training Round (C3TR), it simulates the APFSDS round but with a much reduced safety range thanks to its conical tail which increase aerodynamic drag. It uses the L18A1 CCC charge. It was brought into service in 2003.
L31A7 HESH: This is employed as a general purpose high explosive round, though it also has a good anti-armour performance, and is effective against fortifications and structures. The L31 is fired using the L3 bag charge.
L32A6 SH/Prac: A training projectile, which matches the trajectory of the L31 HESH. It is available as a completely inert form, or can be filled with an inert HE substitute (a composition of calcium sulphate and castor oil) or an inert HE substitute plus a live fuze and a flash pellet for spotting purposes. It is fired with the L3A2 bag charge.
L34A2 Smoke/WP: It matches the L31 HESH in appearance and ballistic performance. It is supplied in a different colour to prevent confusion.

Propellant charges

Operators

Current operators

Future

See also
 L11A5 120 mm rifled gun: British rifled equivalent, developed by Royal Armament Research and Development Established (RARDE) in 1957.
 EXP-28M1 120 mm rifled gun: Experimental British weapon of the late 1970s/early 1980s. Was to have equipped the MBT-80.

Weapons of comparable role, performance and era
 2A46 125 mm gun: Russian 125-mm equivalent, developed by Spetstekhnika Design Bureau in 1960s.
 Rheinmetall 120 mm gun: German equivalent, developed by Rheinmetall in 1974.
 CN120-25 120 mm gun: French equivalent, developed by Établissement d'Études et de Fabrication d'Armements de Bourges (EFAB) in 1979.
 CN120-26 120 mm gun: French equivalent, developed by EFAB in 1980s.
 IMI 120 mm gun: Israeli equivalent, developed by Israeli Military Industries in 1988.
 OTO Breda 120 mm gun: Italian equivalent, developed by OTO Melara in 1988.
 JSW 120 mm gun: Japanese equivalent, developed by Japan Steel Works in 2008.
 CN08 120 mm gun: South Korean equivalent, developed by Agency for Defense Development (ADD) and WIA in 2008.
 2A82-1M 125 mm gun: New Russian 125-mm equivalent, developed by Uralvagonzavod in 2014.

Notes

References 

Tank guns of the United Kingdom
Cold War artillery of the United Kingdom
120 mm artillery
Tank guns
Military equipment introduced in the 1990s